Leander was a   coaster that was built in 1925 by Atlas Werke AG, Hamburg, Germany. The British Royal Navy captured her in November 1939 and impressed her into service as Empire Crusader. She was bombed and sunk in 1940.

Description
The ship was built in 1925 by Atlas Werke AG, Bremen. 

The ship was propelled by a triple expansion steam engine.

History
Leander was built for Neptun Line, Bremen. On 18 February 1931, she caught fire off Domesnaes, Latvia and was abandoned by her crew.

When World War II broke out, she was in port at Vigo, Spain. Unable to get food, she attempted to reach Germany disguised as a Soviet merchant ship. On 9 November the British destroyer  captured her off Vigo. Her captain attempted to scuttle Leander, but was forcibly prevented from doing so by the rest of her crew. Leander was escorted into Falmouth, Cornwall, arriving on 13 November.

Leander was declared to be a prize of war. She was passed to the MoWT and renamed Empire Crusader. She appears to have entered service for the British in March 1940. Empire Crusader sailed in British coastal waters, mostly between Plymouth, Devon and Seaham or Sunderland, County Durham.

On 7 August 1940, Empire Crusader departed from Southend, Essex as a member of Convoy CW 9, bound for the Yarmouth Roads. The next day, in the third aerial attack on the convoy, she was bombed by Junkers Ju 87s of Fliegerkorps VIII, StG 2, off St Catherine's Point, Isle of Wight in the Kanalkampf phase of the Battle of Britain. Her cargo of coal caught fire and the crew abandoned ship. Of her crew of nine, plus six DEMS gunners, four were killed. Her Chief Engineer, James Cowper, was awarded an MBE, and Acting Able Seaman William Robson was commended, for their part in rescuing the ship's Second Mate.

References

1925 ships
Ships built in Hamburg
Steamships of Germany
Merchant ships of Germany
World War II merchant ships of Germany
Empire ships
Ministry of War Transport ships
Steamships of the United Kingdom
Merchant ships of the United Kingdom
Maritime incidents in 1931
Maritime incidents in November 1939
Maritime incidents in August 1940
Shipwrecks in the English Channel
Ships sunk by German aircraft